Street Samurai Catalog is a supplement published by FASA in 1989 for the near-future cyberpunk role-playing game  Shadowrun.

Contents
Street Samurai Catalog is a supplement that presents new weapons, vehicles, cyberware, and other accessories, using the conceit that this is the equipment catalog of a fictional company called Ares. The book is divided into two parts: items for the general public, and items for security and quasi-military forces. As well as a variety of firearms and personal weaponry, several cybernetic implants are also described. Each item takes up one page and is accompanied by an illustration.

The book also includes new rules for some of the items, new street samurai archetypes and a blank street samurai character sheet.

Publication history
Street Samurai Catalog was written by Tom Dowd, and was published by FASA in 1990 as a 116-page softcover book, with illustrations by Timothy Bradstreet, Jeff Laubenstein, and Karl Martin, and cover art by Steve Venters.

In 1996, this book was updated to the rules for the second edition of Shadowrun, resulting in a slightly smaller page count of 109 pages.

In 1999, material was taken from this book, updated to the new rules for Shadowrun 3, and then divided between Man & Machine (1999), and  Cannon Companion (2000).

Reception
Stephan Wieck reviewed Street Samurai Catalog for White Wolf #20, rating it 3 out of 5 overall, and stated that "If you've got [the money] to spare I'd say buy it because you will enjoy it and the Catalog will enrich your Shadowrun campaign, but you can get by without it."

In the November 1992 edition of Dragon (#187), Allen Varney said that this book "belong[s] in any Shadowrun game player's library." Varney noted the items listed in the book already "figure prominently in many of the published adventures." He concluded with a strong recommendation, saying, "its extensive illustrations, samurai archetypes, and cyberware rules enhance every campaign."

Several months later, in the April 1993 edition of Dragon (Issue #192), Rick Swan was less impressed. Although he liked some of the items in the book, especially cyberguns and shock gloves, he found that "too many mundane items (such as precision arrows and — yawn — survival knives) result in a less-than-memorable volume." He concluded that the book wasn't worth the money, pointing out that "each entry fills an entire page, much of it empty space, which hardly makes this a bargain."

Reviews
 Casus Belli #69 (May 1992)

References

Role-playing game supplements introduced in 1989
Shadowrun supplements